Jonathon Ng (born 23 December 1995), known professionally as Eden (stylised as EDEN), is an Irish musician, singer, songwriter, record producer and occasional model. He formerly operated as The Spab Project and later The Eden Project, an alias that was discontinued in 2015. Ng's work as The Eden Project typically featured more conventional styles of electronic dance music such as dubstep and drum and bass, while Eden saw himself venturing into an indie pop style.

Ng released six EPs and over 70 songs and remixes as The Eden Project. As Eden, he launched his own record label, MCMXCV, on which his debut EP End Credits was released.  His second EP, I Think You Think Too Much of Me, was released in August 2016, debuting at No. 43 on the Irish Albums Chart as his first charting music. Eden's debut studio album Vertigo was released on 19 January 2018 and was supported by a world tour. In February 2020, Ng released his sophomore studio album called  “No Future” which is followed by another world tour. “No Future” made it to the top 150 of the all-genres album charts and to the top 10 of the alternative album charts upon one day after release. On September 9th 2022 Ng released his third studio album “ICYMI”.

Life and career

Early life
Jonathon was born on 23 December 1995 to an Irish mother and a Hong Kong father in Dublin, Ireland. From the age of seven, he was trained in classical violin. He later taught himself the piano, guitar, and drums. He attended and graduated from Blackrock College, Dublin.

2013–2015; The Eden Project
Ng began independently releasing tracks as The Eden Project in 2013, achieving popularity through promotion networks. In 2014 he released the album Kairos, in which the tracks "Statues" and "Chasing Ghosts" no
him experimenting with a more subdued alternative style of music. He also was a vocalist in "Iris" (performed by Exit Friendzone)  and made track "Lost". Both tracks along with "Chasing Ghosts" were released on NoCopyrightSounds. In October 2014 he released the Entrance EP, whose indie track "Circles" contrasted his familiar electronic style. His most popular tracks were deviations from his usual sound. On 10 December 2014 he was featured on the track "Scribble" by New York-based producer Puppet, which was released through Monstercat.

In 2015 Ng further embraced his indie style with the Bipolar Paradise EP, whose track "Fumes" has amassed nearly 17 million views on YouTube as of 22 December 2020. He later announced that he was discontinuing The Eden Project, and released Final Call, his last EP under the alias. It contained two covers, one of "Blank Space" by Taylor Swift and the other of "Crazy In Love" by Beyonce. "Times Like These" is officially the last song released under his former alias.

2015–2016; Change to Eden, End Credits, ITYTTMOM and Futurebound Tour

Ng changed his alias to EDEN following the release of Final Call, and began recording new work in spring 2015. The End Credits EP was released for free download worldwide on 8 August through UK-based label Seeking Blue Records, as well as Ng's own imprint MCMXCV. The EP consists of indie pop and alternative electronica tracks with a strong emphasis on vocals. Two singles, "Nocturne" and "Gravity", were released in June and July, respectively. As a whole, the EP has amassed over 14 million plays on the streaming platform SoundCloud.

On 22 March Ng embarked on his End Credits Tour, with concerts in Dublin, London, Toronto, New York City, Los Angeles, and San Francisco. Elliot Crabb was the main producer for the tracks and joined on the End Credits Tour. The tickets were sold out within the week, and an additional venue was set up in New York City due to demand. The tour concluded on 8 April.

Shortly after his End Credits tour, Ng announced that his new EP, I Think You Think Too Much of Me, would be released on 19 August 2016. On 10 June 2016, the first single, "sex", was released, featuring a greater focus on vocals and instrumentation. A month later, Billboard premiered the next single, "drugs", a day before its official release on 15 July 2016. The EP features "Fumes", formerly released under The Eden Project, featuring Gnash, in addition to re-releases of two other The Eden Project songs, remastered versions of "XO" and "Circles". After release, the EP charted on the Irish Albums Chart, becoming Ng's first charting music.

On 7 September 2016 Ng released a second music video for "drugs", a 360 degree video experience in virtual reality. The video amassed 1.5 million Facebook views in one week.

Ng promoted i think you think too much of me through the Futurebound Tour, which began on 7 September 2016 in Vancouver, British Columbia, Canada. The tour included 33 performances in North America and Europe, and concluded on 26 November with a final show in Paris, France.

2017–2019; Vertigo and Vertigo World Tour

Eden embarked on a festival tour in the summer of 2017. He also selected a few fans to film their experiences at each show and post them to his Snapchat account. On 2 September, Ng performed his final show of the festival season at Electric Picnic. During his set, he premiered the official version of "Start//End", a song that had previously been leaked on his SoundCloud account in January.

On 28 September "Start//End" was released on all major music platforms as the first single from the upcoming album Vertigo. The single was accompanied by a music video, which has surpassed 1 million views after trending on YouTube. The video was shot in various places in Europe, North America and Japan.

On 8 November 2017 Eden hinted toward the release of a new single on social media. On 8 and 9 November, Eden's website displayed coordinates where people scavenged to find posters hidden in various locations across the world. "Gold" was officially released 10 November 2017 alongside the announcement of the Vertigo World Tour, which spanned from March to May 2018. Eden's third single for the album, "Crash", was released on 8 December 2017 on Spotify and iTunes.

Vertigo was released on 19 January 2018. Eden began the Vertigo World Tour in promotion of the album in March 2018. The tour ran for eight months, concluding on 27 November. The tour contained 67 shows: 50 in North America, 12 in Europe, and 5 in Oceania. He was joined by various opening acts, including VÉRITÉ, Kacy Hill, and Sasha Sloan.

On 29 June 2018 Eden released an EP called About Time from the collection of songs which were played during the Vertigo World Tour during the break between parts 2 and 3 of the tour. Eden released a single, 909, on 24 April 2019.

2019–2022; no future and no future tour
Two singles from the album No Future, "untitled" and "projector" were released during October 2019. In December 2019, "love, death, distraction" and in January 2020, "isohel", were further released. No Future was officially released on 14 February 2020.

A 2020 world tour was planned in support of the album's release, starting with a hometown show at the Olympia Theatre, Dublin. However, following this show and two subsequent shows at the Roundhouse, London and the Manchester Albert Hall, the no future world tour was postponed indefinitely due to the COVID-19 pandemic. The tour was later cancelled completely on 12 May 2020.

2022–; ICYMI

On 3 June 2022 Eden released a new song called "Modern Warfare" from his new album ICYMI, an acronym for In Case You Missed It, that contains a lot of his unreleased songs, which were sometimes performed at his shows during the End Credits Anniversary tour. On 8 July 2022, Eden released the second song of his new album called "Balling". On 12 August 2022, Eden released the third song from his new album. The song is called "Sci-Fi".

The album was announced on 10 August 2022 with an official release date set on 9 September 2022.

Personal life
EDEN is a supporter of Liverpool F.C.

Additional works
Prior to the release of End Credits, Ng provided uncredited vocals for Mendum's song "Elysium", as well as credited vocals for Crywolf's song "Stomach It". The vocals from "woah", a track in The Eden Project's Final Call EP, were sampled in the track "I'll Be Your Reason" by Illenium. Following the release of End Credits, Ng provided uncredited vocals on the track "No More" by Pierce Fulton, which was released on 9 November 2015 through Armada Music. Ng also provided vocals for Illenium's "Leaving" in 2017. In 2018, Ng provided uncredited vocals for Jeremy Zucker's "thinking 2 much".

Ng also performed the song Amnesia, presumably during his last year in secondary school. He later stated, during a livestream, that the song would never have a studio version.

In November 2015, Ng released a cover of Michael Jackson's "Billie Jean" for free download. It amassed over 1 million plays on most streaming platforms.

Discography

Studio albums

Extended plays

Singles

As main artist

Tours
 End Credits Tour (2016)
 Futurebound Tour (2016)
 Vertigo World Tour (2018)
 No Future Tour (2020) (cancelled due to COVID-19 pandemic)
 End Credits RETOUR (2021)
 ICYMI Tour (2023)

References

1995 births
Living people
Irish electronic musicians
Irish male singer-songwriters
Irish people of Hong Kong descent
Irish rock musicians
Musicians from Dublin (city)
People educated at Blackrock College
Place of birth missing (living people)
21st-century Irish singers